Matteo Viola was the defending champion but he did not participate this year.

Andrej Martin won the tournament, defeating Nicolás Kicker in the final, 6–2, 6–2.

Seeds

Draw

Finals

Top half

Bottom half

External links
 Main Draw
 Qualifying Draw

2015 ATP Challenger Tour|Challenger Pulcra Lachiter Biella - Singles